Tumminakatti is a village in the southern state of Karnataka, India. It is located in the Ranibennur taluk of Haveri district in Karnataka.

Overview 

It is situated 24km from Ranebennur and 63km from Haveri.
There are about 2500 houses in tumminakatti village. The local language is Kannada.

Education

The literacy rate is 80%. Government primary and middle, private primary and middle and government secondary schools and colleges are available in tumminakatti.

Health

There is one primary health care center, 2 primary health sub centers, 1 maternity and child welfare center, 1 TB clinic, 1 veterinary hospital, 2 family welfare centers, 6 clinics, and 7 medical shops.

Agriculture: 

Maize and cotton are agriculture commodities grow in Tumminakatti.

Known for:
"Green gram wada", made from Green gram (Hesaru Bele). and also famous for handloom clothes especially "vastra", "neeru panche" was used for god worship.

Demographics
 India census, Tumminakatti had a population of 20000

See also

 Ranebennur
 Haveri
 Districts of Karnataka

References

External links
 http://Haveri.nic.in/

Villages in Haveri district